The Great Saxon Revolt was a civil war fought between 1077 and 1088, early in the history of the Holy Roman Empire. The revolt was led by a group of opportunistic German princes who elected as their figurehead the duke of Swabia, Rudolf of Rheinfeld, who became the anti-king. Rudolf was a two-way brother-in-law of the young Henry IV, Holy Roman Emperor, who had been crowned at the age of six and had taken the reins of power at age sixteen. The Great Revolt followed the Saxon Rebellion of 1073–75.

Background
The duke had played power politics with the young emperor several years earlier in his reign, and was demonstrably ruthless (kidnapping and forcing the marriage to Henry's sister) even without the support of the other princes of the Kingdom of Germany. The allied nobility were moved to take advantage of the momentary weakness of the Emperor in a period when he was at odds and had been excommunicated by Pope Gregory VII over the issue of who was entitled to appoint whom, who was therefore subservient to whom, as well as a dispute over the Emperor-elect's desire to divorce from his arranged wife.

Rebels' Forchheim meeting
After meeting with a penitent Henry IV in the fall of 1076, the pope had removed the first excommunication of the impetuous and hot-headed 26-year-old monarch. However, during the same fall-winter season the organizers of the revolt by the nobility were arranging for all to meet in late winter to further their own ends against the interests of the young emperor-elect. With the delays of news and events imposed by High Middle Ages travel, communications heralding the rapprochement were delayed enough that the decision was made to just go ahead and meet anyway. The diverse council of Saxon, Bavarian, and Carinthian princes met in the March 1077, about as soon as early spring travel conditions allowed, in Forchheim (Oberfranken), and despite the reconciliation between the pope and Henry decided to press forward with their desires to expand their own powers.

The rebels and their policies
The group consisted of high-ranking secular rulers as well as churchmen—who had up until the very recent Investiture Controversy and crisis been appointed by the Holy Roman Emperor—the new canon law reforms which set up the College of Cardinals had heavily involved Pope Gregory VII. Prior to Henry's crowning at the age of six as the Emperor, the Emperor had been crowned by the Pope, who in turn he'd appointed. Henry's age of inheritance had been a flash point leading to much discussion and controversy spurring the reform. As the elected anti-king, Rudolf hoped to achieve the greater nobilities' backing by promising to respect the electoral concept of the monarchy (thus accepting a more limited and greater circumscribed set of powers as King of Germany) and the pope's backing by openly declaring his willingness to be subservient to the pope, as King of the Romans.

Rudolf's crowning and first battles
Despite these difficulties, Henry's situation in Germany improved in the following years. When Rudolf was crowned at Mainz in May 1077 by one of the plotters, Siegfried I, Archbishop of Mainz, the population revolted and forced him, the archbishop, and other nobles to flee to Saxony. Positioned there, Rudolf was geographically and then militarily deprived of his territories (later he was also stripped of Swabia) by Henry. After the inconclusive Battle of Mellrichstadt (7 August 1077) and the defeat of Henry's forces in the Battle of Flarchheim (27 January 1080), Gregory VII, who had a personal grudge against the Emperor-elect due to his intemperate language in earlier discourse, decided to flip-flop his decision supporting Henry to instead support the revolt and launched a second anathema (excommunication) against Henry in March 1080, thereby supporting the anti-king duke Rudolf. However, there was ample evidence that Gregory's actions were rooted in hate for the Emperor-elect instead of theology and so had an unfavorable personal impact on the Pope's reputation and authority, leading much of Germany to re-embrace Henry's cause.

Decisive Battle of Elster
On 14 October 1080 the armies of the two rival kings met at the White Elster River during the Battle of Elster in the plain of Leipzig and Henry's forces again suffered a military defeat; however, the strategic outcome turned into a victory for Henry, as Rudolf was mortally wounded and died the next day at nearby Merseburg, leading to the rebellion against Henry losing much of its momentum.

Henry's victory over the pope
Henry convoked a synod of the highest German clergy in Bamberg and Brixen (June 1080). Here Henry had Pope Gregory (whom he had dubbed "The False Monk") deposed and replaced him by appointing the primate of Ravenna, Guibert (now known as the Antipope Clement III), reasserting the Holy Roman Emperors' traditional right to appoint the pope for his side of the Investiture Controversy—though who was in the right was unclear in the day—the emperor reacting to retain his traditional prerogatives against the new canon law appointing the pope via the College of Cardinals. For the next few years, the civil war shifted south of the Alps.

Hermann, the new anti-king
While Henry campaigned there, the German aristocracy replaced their king Rudolf with the belated election of king Hermann of Salm ( 1035 – 28 September 1088), also known as Herman of Luxembourg, as their new anti-king in August 1081, but he was fought successfully to a stalemate by Frederick I, Duke of Swabia (Frederick of Swabia)—Rudolf's Henry-appointed successor in Swabia who had married Henry's daughter Agnes. In 1084, Henry was crowned Holy Roman Emperor by Antipope Clement III while Pope Gregory was in exile. This left the anti-king Hermann of Salm in an awkward position as partisans of Henry supported the deposition of Gregory and the elevation of Clement III.

Hermann's plan to gather an army on the banks of the Danube and march into Italy in support of the pope was dashed by the death of his main retainer, Otto of Nordheim. When Henry, now the crowned Holy Roman Emperor, returned north and came into Saxony with an army in 1085, Hermann fled to Denmark. He returned, however, in alliance with Welf I, Duke of Bavaria, and defeated the emperor at the Battle of Pleichfeld in 1086 on the River Main, taking Würzburg.

End of the revolt
Soon after his victory, however, Hermann tired of being a pawn in the hands of the grandees and retired to his familial estates. The Great Saxon Revolt civil war may have ended in 1088, for in 1089 Countess Matilda married Duke Welf II of Bavaria, but Duke Welf I only died in 1101.

See also
Concordat of Worms
Investiture Controversy

Notes

Citations

References

 
11th-century rebellions
History of Saxony
Wars involving the Holy Roman Empire
11th century in Europe
11th-century conflicts
1070s in the Holy Roman Empire
1077 in Europe
1078 in Europe
Medieval rebellions in Europe